Karumanchi is a village in Savalyapuram mandal in Guntur district in the state of Andhra Pradesh in India.

Geography
Much like the rest of villages in Guntur district, it has very hot summers and mild winters. Rainfall is mostly in the months of July to September.

The STD code of the village is +91 8646 and PIN Code is 522646.

Demographics 
 India census, Karumanchi had a population of around 7441 with 3727 males and 3714 females.

History 

Inscriptions from about 1000 to 1400 CE have been traced. The age-old Sri venkateswara Temple, also known as "Pedda Gudi" by local people, is a temple constructed by Krishna Devaraya, a dynasty that ruled the area.

The Zilla Parishad High [ZPHS] School, Karumanchi is a well-known school that was established in 1950. At that time, this was the only school in and around the whole taluk that has facilities up to SSLC and provided good education for many.

References 

Villages in Guntur district